Humphrey's Executor v. United States, 295 U.S. 602 (1935), was a Supreme Court of the United States case decided regarding whether the United States President has the power to remove executive officials of a quasi-legislative or quasi-judicial administrative body for reasons other than what is allowed by Congress. The Court held that the President did not have this power. However, Humphrey's has been distinguished by Seila Law LLC v. Consumer Financial Protection Bureau. In Seila, Chief Justice John Roberts described Humphrey's as holding that Congress may occasionally create independent agencies with removal only for cause if such agencies share the characteristics of the FTC in 1935.

Background
US President Herbert Hoover appointed William Humphrey as a member of the Federal Trade Commission (FTC) in 1925, and Humphrey was reappointed for another six-year term in 1931. After Roosevelt took office in 1933, he became dissatisfied with Humphrey since Roosevelt viewed Humphrey as inadequately supportive of the New Deal.

Roosevelt twice requested Humphrey to resign from the FTC, but Humphrey did not yield. Finally, in 1933 Roosevelt fired Humphrey. Nevertheless, Humphrey continued to come to work at the FTC even after he was formally fired. However, the Federal Trade Commission Act permitted the President to dismiss an FTC member only for "inefficiency, neglect of duty, or malfeasance in office." Roosevelt's decision to dismiss Humphrey was based solely on political differences, rather than job performance or alleged acts of malfeasance.

Decision

Opinion 
The case went to the Supreme Court, but Humphrey died in 1934 before the case could be decided. The case was then pursued by the executors of his estate and so it obtained the title "Humphrey's Executor."

The Court distinguished between executive officers and quasi-legislative or quasi-judicial officers. The Court held that the latter may be removed only with procedures consistent with statutory conditions enacted by Congress, but the former serve at the pleasure of the President and may be removed at his discretion. The Court ruled that the Federal Trade Commission was a quasi-legislative body because it adjudicated cases and promulgated rules. Thus, the President could not fire a member solely for political reasons. Therefore, Humphrey's firing was improper. 

During its analysis, the Court distinguished Myers v. United States and rejected its dicta that the President has unencumbered removal powers.

Subsequent treatment 
US Attorney General Robert H. Jackson, who later joined the Supreme Court himself, said in his memoirs that Roosevelt was particularly annoyed by the Court's decision, as the President felt that it had been rendered in spite. 

Humphrey's was distinguished in Seila Law LLC v. Consumer Financial Protection Bureau (2020). Chief Justice Roberts narrowly construed Humphrey's to stand for the proposition that the President's removal power may be constrained by Congress if the officer in question was a member of an agency that shared the same characteristics as the Federal Trade Commission in 1935. However, scholars argue that no such agency currently exists because no such agency existed when Humphrey's was decided because the Court misconstrued the FTC's powers at the time.

See also 
 The Appointments Clause of the U.S. Constitution
 
 
 
 
 Seila Law LLC v. Consumer Financial Protection Bureau, 591 U.S.  (2020)
 List of United States Supreme Court cases, volume 295

References

External links

 

United States separation of powers case law
1935 in United States case law
United States Supreme Court cases
United States Supreme Court cases of the Hughes Court
United States administrative case law
Appointments Clause case law
Constitutional challenges to the New Deal